There were at least four special elections to the United States House of Representatives in 1965, during 89th United States Congress.

Elections are listed by date and district.



List of elections 

|-
| 
| Albert Watson
|  | Democratic
| 
|  | Incumbent resigned February 1, 1965 after being stripped of seniority by the House Democratic Caucus for supporting Republican Presidential candidate Barry Goldwater.Incumbent re-elected June 15, 1965.Republican gain.
| nowrap | 

|-
| 
| Ashton Thompson
|  | Democratic
| 
|  | Incumbent died July 1, 1965.New member elected October 2, 1965.Democratic hold.
| nowrap | 

|-
| 
| Clarence J. Brown
|  | Republican
| 
|  | Incumbent died August 23, 1965.New member elected November 2, 1965.Republican hold.
| nowrap | 

|-
| 
| James Roosevelt
|  | Democratic
| 
|  | Incumbent resigned to run for Mayor of Los Angeles.New member elected December 15, 1965.Democratic hold.
| nowrap | 

|}

References 

 
1965